La Croix de Berny is a station of Paris RER in Antony, near Sceaux.

Bus line connection
Since 2007, a bus line, the TVM (Trans Val de Marne) from Créteil is connected to the RER B at this station.

References

See also

 List of stations of the Paris RER

Railway stations in France opened in 1854
Réseau Express Régional stations in Hauts-de-Seine